Yuvatha is a 2008 Indian Telugu-language film directed by Parasuram starring Nikhil Siddhartha and Aksha in the lead roles. It was released on 7 November 2008 to positive reviews and was declared a hit at the box office.

Plot
Babu (Nikhil Siddharth), an orphan brought up by his uncle and aunt, believes that they swindled his property. Once when his uncle chides him, he leaves home for Hyderabad to stay with his friends, whom he trusts. Kindhearted as he is, Babu believes that life is to be happy and make others happy. Babu meets Baby (Aksha) accidentally, and they become good friends. Whenever she is lonely, Babu and his three friends - a software engineer Ajay (Randhir Gattla), a security guard Kiran, and an assistant film director Subbu - cheer her up. Once during her birthday, some goons tease Baby, and Babu thrashes them. Later, they settle scores with Babu, but Subbu suffers grievous injuries. Upon the doctor's demand for 5 lakh for surgery, Babu borrows from a moneylender named Laddu (Narsing Yadav), on the condition that he would pay the money back in a week. However, they cannot pay the money and plead for two more days' time. In a bid to avoid risking their lives in the hands of the goon, Babu and Ajay go to rob a bank but get trapped in a robbery case which they had not committed. They suspect Kiran as the culprit. Babu and Ajay both get jailed. However, Babu befriends the jailer (Jaya Prakash Reddy) and a notorious criminal named Nannanna (Sayaji Shinde). At this juncture, Sonu Seth (Jeeva) enters and ensures their release. They come to know that another criminal named Nayeem was behind the robbery, and suspecting links between the criminal in the jail and Nayeem, Babu beseeches his help, and he obliges. The court rules that Nayeem is the real culprit. Babu, Ajay, and Kiran, surrender themselves and the money in the court. They are jailed for six months for leaving the jail earlier. The film ends on a happy note with the reunion of the four friends and Baby.

Cast

 Nikhil Siddhartha as Veerababu "Babu"
 Aksha as Divya "Baby"
 Randhir Gattla as Ajay
 Sayaji Shinde as Nannanna
 Jaya Prakash Reddy as Jailer
 Narsing Yadav as Laddu
 Jeeva as Sonu Seth
 Prudhviraj as Krishna Manohar
 Ravi Prakash as Doctor
 Srinivasa Reddy as Constable
 Shankar Melkote as Loan Agent
 Krishnudu as Suribabu (special appearance)
 Sivannarayana Naripeddi as House owner, Madhavi's father

Soundtrack

The music of Yuvatha was released on 21 August 2008 at Jouk Pub, Banjara Hills, Hyderabad. Aditya Music marketed the audio, with six songs. Producer and distributor Dil Raju released the audio CD and presented the first number to Hari, one of the producers. Bommarillu Bhaskar unveiled the audio cassette and gave it to director Parasuram. The event was graced by hero Nikhil, debut heroine Aksha, Monali, fight masters Ram Lakshman, lyricist Krishna Chaitanya, actor Srinivasa Reddy, cinematographer Jaswant and others.

The music and background score was composed by Mani Sharma and all the lyrics were penned by  Krishna Chaitanya.

Reception 
A critic from 123telugu wrote that the film is a "Decent entertainer and a good one time watch".

References

External links
 

2000s Telugu-language films
Films scored by Mani Sharma
Films directed by Parasuram